Hank DeVincent Field is a baseball venue located on the campus of La Salle University in Philadelphia, Pennsylvania, United States. The field was home to the La Salle Explorers baseball team of the NCAA Division I Atlantic 10 Conference.  The field holds a capacity of 1,000 spectators.

Renovations

Left field wall
In fall 2007, the school heightened the field's left field wall to prevent home run balls from breaking the windows of buildings over the fence.  The chain link was painted green in homage to the Green Monster at Fenway Park in Boston, Massachusetts, home of Major League Baseball's Boston Red Sox.  The Green Monster, which is also green, is the left field fence at Fenway.  A new batting cage was constructed at the same time as the wall, and both improvements were part of a campus-wide construction project.

Dugouts
In fall 2012, the field's dugouts were lengthened and upgraded.

References

College baseball venues in the United States
College field hockey venues in the United States
Sports venues in Pennsylvania
La Salle Explorers baseball
Baseball venues in Pennsylvania